Eroni Loganimoce (born October 6, 1930) is a former Fijian cricketer. Loganimoce was a right-arm medium pace bowler.

Loganimoce made his first-class debut for Fiji in 1954 against Canterbury during Fiji's 1953/54 tour of New Zealand. During the tour he played two further first-class matches, with his final first-class match for Fiji coming against Auckland.

In his 3 first-class matches for Fiji he scored 31 runs at a batting average of 7.75, with a high score of 22. With the ball he took 5 wickets at a bowling average of 35.40, with best figures of 2/45. In the field Loganimoce took 3 catches.

Loganimoce also represented Fiji in 58 non first-class matches from 1954 to 1978, with his final match for Fiji coming against Franklin, 24 years after his debut for Fiji in 1954.

External links
Eroni Loganimoce at Cricinfo
Eroni Loganimoce at CricketArchive

1930 births
Living people
People from Lakeba
Fijian cricketers
I-Taukei Fijian people